Marcell Takács (born 24 July 1989, in Budapest) is a Hungarian footballer (midfielder) player who currently plays for FC Schötz.

External links
 Profile on HLSZ.hu 
 Profile on tatabanyafc.hu 

1989 births
Living people
Footballers from Budapest
Hungarian footballers
Association football midfielders
FC Tatabánya players
Újpest FC players
BFC Siófok players
FC Hansa Rostock players
FC Wil players
BKV Előre SC footballers
Ceglédi VSE footballers
Nemzeti Bajnokság I players
Hungarian expatriate footballers
Expatriate footballers in Germany
Expatriate footballers in Switzerland
Hungarian expatriate sportspeople in Germany
Hungarian expatriate sportspeople in Switzerland